Thomas Nyberg (born 17 April 1962) is a Swedish sprinter. He competed in the men's 4 × 400 metres relay at the 1984 Summer Olympics.

References

1962 births
Living people
Athletes (track and field) at the 1984 Summer Olympics
Swedish male sprinters
Swedish male hurdlers
Olympic athletes of Sweden
Place of birth missing (living people)
20th-century Swedish people